Uruguay will participate in the 2011 Parapan American Games.

Athletics

Uruguay will send one male athletes to compete.

Football 5-a-side

Uruguay will send a team of ten athletes to compete.

Swimming

Uruguay will send three male swimmers to compete.

Wheelchair tennis

Uruguay will send one male athlete to compete.

Nations at the 2011 Parapan American Games
2011 in Uruguayan sport
Uruguay at the Pan American Games